Birubari is a locality of Guwahati, Assam, India. It is surrounded by localities of Rupnagar and Bhangagarh.

See also
 Ganeshguri
 Paltan Bazaar

References

Neighbourhoods in Guwahati